Five Great Gift Ideas from the Reels is an extended play released by Australian band the Reels in November 1980. It was released during the recording sessions for the band's album Quasimodo's Dream. The EP consisted of 5 tracks: 4 covers and 1 original. It charted at #12 in Australia and was certified gold. "According to My Heart", a cover of the 1961 Jim Reeves song was also controversially included on their album Quasimodo's Dream.

The EP was produced by Bruce Brown and Russell Dunlop, featured mainly covers, including Jim Reeves' "According to My Heart", and Freda Payne's "Band of Gold". "Neon Rainbow" was a song made popular by the Box Tops. "According to My Heart" featured a folksy music video filmed at the farm of Australian country music star Smokey Dawson. 

The EP did, however, have one original; "The Bombs Dropped on Xmas", co-written by Mason, Newham and Ansel

Track listing
Side One
"You Got Soul" (Johnny Nash) - 3:03
"Neon Rainbow" (Thompson) - 3:00
Side Two
"The Bombs Dropped on Xmas" (Mason-Newham-Ansel) - 3:13
"According to My Heart" (Jim Reeves) - 3:12
"Band of Gold" (Wayne-Dunbar) - 2:25

Charts

Weekly Charts

Year-end charts

References

1980 debut EPs
The Reels albums